The Celtic  harp is a triangular frame harp traditional to the Celtic nations of northwest Europe. In Ireland and Scotland, it was a wire-strung instrument requiring great skill and long practice to play, and was associated with the Gaelic ruling class. It appears on Irish coins, the coat of arms of the Republic of Ireland, Montserrat, Canada as well as the flag of Montserrat.

Early history

The early history of the triangular frame harp in Europe is contested. This word may originally have described a different stringed instrument, being etymologically related to the Welsh crwth.

A notched piece of wood which some have interpreted to be part of the bridge of an Iron Age lyre dating to around 300 BC was discovered on the Isle of Skye, which, if actually a bridge, would make it the oldest surviving fragment of a western European stringed instrument (although images of Greek lyres are much older). The earliest descriptions of a European triangular framed harp, i.e. harps with a fore pillar, are found on carved 8th century Pictish stones.<ref>The Anglo Saxon Harp, 'Spectrum, Vol. 71, No. 2 (Apr. 1996), pp. 290–320.</ref>Scotland, Insight Guides. Josephine Buchanan 2003, pp94 Published 2003 Langenscheidt Publishing Group.Scotland's Music: A History of the Traditional and Classical Music of Scotland from Early Times to the Present Day. John Purser (2007) Mainstream Publishing Group. Pictish harps were strung from horsehair. The instruments apparently spread south to the Anglo Saxons who commonly used gut strings and then west to the Gaels of the Highlands and to Ireland.J. Keay & Julia Keay. (2000): Collins Encyclopaedia of Scotland, Clarsach, p. 171. Harper Collins publishers.Celtic Music History and Criticism Kenneth Mathieson 2001 Backbeat books p192 Exactly thirteen depictions of any triangular chordophone instrument from pre-11th-century Europe exist and twelve of them come from Scotland.

The earliest Irish references to stringed instruments are from the 6th century, and players of such instruments were held in high regard by the nobility of the time. Early Irish law from 700 AD stipulates that bards and 'cruit' players should sit with the nobility at banquets and not with the common entertainers. Another stringed instrument from this era was the tiompán, most likely a kind of lyre. Despite providing the earliest evidence of stringed instruments in Ireland, no records described what these instruments looked like, or how the cruit and tiompán differed from one another.

Only two quadrangular instruments occur within the Irish context on the west coast of Scotland and both carvings date two hundred years after the Pictish carvings. The first true representations of the Irish triangular harp do not appear till the late eleventh century in a reliquary and the twelfth century on stone and the earliest harps used in Ireland were quadrangular lyres as ecclesiastical instruments, One study suggests Pictish stone carvings may be copied from the Utrecht Psalter, the only other source outside Pictish Scotland to display a Triangular Chordophone instrument. The Utrecht Psalter was penned between 816 and 835 AD. However, Pictish Triangular Chordophone carvings found on the Nigg Stone date from 790 to 799 AD. and pre-date the document by up to forty years. Other Pictish sculptures also predate the Utrecht Psalter, namely the harper on the Dupplin Cross from c. 800 AD.

The Norman-Welsh cleric and scholar Gerald of Wales (c.1146 – c.1223), whose Topographica Hibernica et Expugnatio Hibernica is a description of Ireland from the Anglo-Norman point of view, praised Irish harp music (if little else), stating:
 

However, Gerald, who had a strong dislike of the Gaelic Irish, somewhat contradicts himself. While admitting that the style of music originated in Ireland, he immediately added that, in "the opinion of many", the Scots and the Welsh had now surpassed them in that skill. Gerald refers to the cythara and the tympanum, but their identification with the harp is uncertain, and it is not known that he ever visited Scotland.

Early images of the clàrsach are not common in Scottish iconography, but a gravestone at Kiells, in Argyllshire, dating from about 1500, shows one with a typically large soundbox, decorated with Gaelic designs. The Irish Saint Máedóc of Ferns reliquary shrine dates from c.1100, and clearly shows King David with a triangular framed harp including a "T-Section" in the pillar. The Irish word lamhchrann or Scottish Gaelic làmh-chrann came into use at an unknown date to indicate this pillar which would have supplied the bracing to withstand the tension of a wire-strung harp.

Three of the four pre-16th-century authentic harps that survive today are of Gaelic provenance: the Brian Boru Harp in Trinity College, Dublin, and the Queen Mary and Lamont Harps, both in the National Museum of Scotland, Edinburgh. The last two are examples of the small low-headed harp, and were long believed to have been made from hornbeam, a wood not native to Scotland or Ireland. This theory has been refuted by Karen Loomis in her 2015 PhD thesis</ref>. All three are dated approximately to the 15th century and may have been made in Argyll in western Scotland.See Caldwell 1982.

One of the largest and most complete collections of 17th–18th century harp music is the work of Turlough O'Carolan, a blind, itinerant Irish harper and composer. At least 220 of his compositions survive to this day.

Characteristics and function
In construction, the Irish and Scottish harp may, in general, be considered as one. A characteristic feature is the metal strings. Historical sources mention various types of wire, including brass and iron, and some scholars also argue for the use of silver and gold. The wires were attached to a massive soundbox typically carved from a single log, commonly of willow, although other woods including alder and poplar have been identified in extant harps. This harp also had a reinforced curved pillar and a substantial neck, flanked with thick brass cheek bands. The strings, usually played with the fingernails, produced a brilliant ringing sound. This type of harp is also unique amongst single row triangular harps in that the first two strings tuned in the middle of the gamut were set to the same pitch.

Components

The names of the components of the cláirseach were as follows:

The corr had a brass strap nailed to each side, pierced by tapered brass tuning pins. The treble end had a tenon which fitted into the top of the com (soundbox). On a low-headed harp the corr was morticed at the bass end to receive a tenon on the lámhchrann; on a high-headed harp this tenon fitted into a mortice on the back of the lámhchrann.

The coim  (soundbox) was usually carved from a single piece of willow, hollowed out from behind. A panel of harder timber was carefully inserted to close the back.Crú na d-tead (string shoes) were usually made of brass and prevented the metal strings from cutting into the wood of the soundbox.

The fhorshnaidhm may refer to the wooden toggle to which a string was fastened once it had emerged from its hole in the soundboard.

Playing technique
The playing of the wire-strung harp has been described as extremely difficult. Because of the long-lasting resonance, the performer had to dampen strings which had just been played while new strings were being plucked, and this while playing rapidly. Contrary to conventional modern practice, the left hand played the treble and the right the bass. It was said that a player should begin to learn the harp no later than the age of seven. The best modern players have shown, however, that reasonable competence may be achieved even at a later age.

Social function and decline
During the medieval period, the wire-strung harp was in demand throughout the Gaelic territories, which stretched from the northern Highlands and Western Isles of Scotland to the south of Ireland. The Gaelic worlds of Scotland and Ireland, however, while retaining close links, were already showing signs of divergence in the sixteenth century in language, music and social structure.

The harp was the aristocratic instrument of Gaelic Ireland, and harpers enjoyed a high social status which was codified in Brehon Law. The patronage of harpers was adopted by Norman and British settlers in Ireland until the late 18th century, although their standing in society was greatly diminished with the introduction of the English class system. In his biography of Turlough O'Carolan, historian Donal O'Sullivan writes:

The function of the clàrsach in a Hebridean lordship, both as entertainment and as literary metaphor, is illustrated in the songs of Màiri Nic Leòid (Mary MacLeod) (–), a prominent Gaelic poet of her time. The chief is praised as one who is skilled in judging harp-playing, the theme of a story and the pith of sense:

 Tuigsear nan teud,
 Purpais gach sgèil,
 Susbaint gach cèill nàduir.

The music of harp and pipe is shown to be intrinsic to the splendour of the MacLeod court, along with wine in shining cups:Gu àros nach crìonAm bi gàirich nam pìobIs nan clàrsach a rìsLe deàrrsadh nam pìosA' cur sàraidh air fìonIs 'ga leigeadh an gnìomh òircheard.

Here the great Highland bagpipe shares the high status of the clàrsach. It would help supplant the harp, and may already have developed its own classical tradition in the form of the elaborate "great music" (ceòl mòr). An elegy to Sir Donald MacDonald of Clanranald, attributed to his widow in 1618, contains a very early reference to the bagpipe in a lairdly setting:

 Is iomadh sgal pìobadh Mar ri farrum nan dìsnean air clàr Rinn mi èisdeachd a’d' bhaile... There is evidence that the musical tradition of the clàrsach may have influenced the use and repertoire of the bagpipe. The oral mnemonic system called canntaireachd, used for encoding and teaching ceòl mòr, is first mentioned in the 1226 obituary of a clàrsair (harp player). Terms relating to theme and variation on the clàrsach and the bagpipe correlate to each other. Founders of bagpipe dynasties are also noted as clársach players.

The names of a number of the last harpers are recorded. The blind Duncan McIndeor, who died in 1694, was harper to Campbell of Auchinbreck, but also frequented Edinburgh. A receipt for "two bolls of meall", dated 1683, is extant for another harper, also blind, named Patrick McErnace, who apparently played for Lord Neill Campbell. The harper Manus McShire is mentioned in an account book covering the period 1688–1704. A harper called Neill Baine is mentioned in a letter dated 1702 from a servitor of Allan MacDonald of Clanranald. Angus McDonald, harper, received payment on the instructions of Menzies of Culdares on 19 June 1713, and the Marquis of Huntly's accounts record a payment to two harpers in 1714. Other harpers include Rory Dall Morison (who died ), Lachlan Dall (who died ), and Murdoch MacDonald (who died ).

By the middle of the eighteenth century the "violer" (fiddle player) had replaced the harper, a consequence, perhaps, of the growing influence in the Gaelic world of Lowland Scots culture.

Revival

In the early 19th century, even as the old Gaelic harp tradition was dying out, a new harp was developed in Ireland. It had gut strings and semitone mechanisms like an orchestral pedal harp, and was built and marketed by John Egan, a pedal harp maker in Dublin.

The new harp was small and curved like the historical  or Irish harp, but it was strung with gut and its soundbox was lighter. In the 1890s a similar new harp became popular in Scotland as part of a Gaelic cultural revival.

A notable event in the revival of the Celtic harp is the Edinburgh International Harp Festival, which has been held annually since 1982 and includes both performances and instructional workshops.

Bibliography

 Armstrong, Robert Bruce (1904). The Irish and The Highland Harps. Edinburgh: David Douglas.
 Bannerman, John (1991). "The Clàrsach and the Clàrsair". Scottish Studies, vol. 30 no. 3.
 Budgey, Andrea (2002). "Musical relations between Scotland and Ireland" [in] McDonald, R. Andrew, [ed.] Literature and Music in Scotland: 700–1560. University of Toronto Press, ; .
 Caldwell, D.H., [ed.] (1982). Angels, Nobles and Unicorns: Art and Patronage in Medieval Scotland. Edinburgh: NMS.
 Cathcart, Cynthia (Summer 2009). "Silver report: Precious metal strings on the wire-strung harp". Folk Harp Journal, no. 143, pp. 34–43. available via wirestrungharp.com  .
 Chadwick, Simon (November 2008). "The Early Irish Harp". Early Music, vol. 36, no. 4, pp. 521–532.
 Collinson, Francis (1983)[1966]. The Bagpipe, Fiddle and Harp. Routledge & Kegan Paul, 1966; reprinted by Lang Syne Publishers Ltd., .
 Dimock, James F., [ed.] (1867). Giraldi Cambrensis opera: Giraldi Cambrensis Topographica Hibernica et Expugnatio Hibernica. London, UK: Longmans, Green, Reader, and Dyer.
 Farmer, Henry George (1947). A History of Music in Scotland, p. 280. London, UK.
 Heymann, Ann & Heymann, Charlie (Fall 1991). "Cláirseach: The Lore of the Irish Harp". Éire-Ireland, vol. 26, no. 3.
 Heymann, Ann & Heymann, Charlie (Summer 2003). "Strings of Gold". The Historical Harp Society Journal, vol. 13, no. 3, pp. 9–15. available via annheymann.com  .
 Lanier, Sara C. (1999). "'It is new-strung and shan't be heard': Nationalism and Memory in the Irish Harp Tradition". British Journal of Ethnomusicology, vol. 8.
 Lawlor, Helen (2012). Irish Harping, 1900–2010. Dublin: Four Courts Press, .
 Le Govic, Tristan (2015). The Breton Harp Anthology (Antologiezh Telenn Breizh) Vol. II
 Newton, Michael & Cheape, Hugh (n.d.) "The Keening of Women and the Roar of the Pipe: From Clársach to Bagpipe, ca. 1600–1782". available via academia.edu  .
 Ó Brógáin, Séamas (1998). The Irish Harp Emblem. Dublin, IE: Wolfhound Press, .
 O'Donnell, Mary Louise (2014). Ireland's Harp: The Shaping of Irish Identity c.1770–1880. Dublin, IE: University College Dublin Press, .
 Rensch, Roslyn (1989). Harps and Harpists, pp. 125–127. Indiana University Press.
 Rimmer, Joan (1964). "The Morphology of the Irish Harp". The Galpin Society Journal, no. 17.
 Rimmer, Joan (1984)[1969] The Irish Harp: Cláirseach na hÉireann, 3rd ed.  The Mercier Press,  [1st ed. 1969; 2nd ed. 1977].
 Sanger, Keith & Kinnaird, Alison (1992). Tree of Strings – Crann nan Teud. Kinmor Music, .
 Watson, J. Carmichael, [ed.] (1934). Gaelic Songs of Mary MacLeod. Blackie & Son. available via archive.org .
 Yeats, Gráinne (1980). Féile na gCruitirí, Béal Feirste'' [The Belfast Harpers' Festival] 1972. Gael Linn, .

References

External links

Historical Harp Society of Ireland
An Chúirt Chruitireachta, International traditional harp course held annually in Termonfeckin Co. Louth, Ireland
The Clarsach Society/Comunn na Clarsaich, resource centre for the Scottish harp
Edinburgh International Harp Festival
List of surviving early Gaelic harps
Historic wire-strung harps and harpers listed and described on wirestrungharp.com
Gaelic Modes Web articles on Gaelic harp harmony and modes
Treasures of early Irish art, 1500 B.C. to 1500 A.D., an exhibition catalogue from The Metropolitan Museum of Art (fully available online as PDF), which contains material on Clàrsach (cat. no. 68)
Asni: harp lore – descriptions of several types of historical European harps (with sound samples)
The Celtic Harp Page – information on Celtic and other types of harps
My Harp's Delight – learning to play the Celtic harp, tips and techniques, buying a harp
Teifi Harps – Celtic & Folk Harps in Wales
"Tears, Laughter, Magic" – An Interview with Master Celtic Harp Builder Timothy Habinski on AdventuresInMusic.biz, 2007
Celtic Harp Amplification Series – using microphones and guitar amplifiers with folk harps
Markwood Strings – Information on installing harp strings, harp string installation guide
 Early Gaelic Harp site by Simon Chadwick

Composite chordophones
Culture of medieval Scotland
Frame harps
Irish musical instruments
Medieval Ireland
National symbols of Ireland
Scottish music